Phragmipedium warszewiczianum is a species of orchid occurring from Colombia to Ecuador.

References

External links 

warszewiczianum
Orchids of Colombia
Orchids of Ecuador